Frederic Augustus Potterton  was an Anglican priest, most notably Archdeacon then Dean of Ardagh. 
 
He was educated at Trinity College, Dublin and ordained deacon in 1856 and priest in 1857. He served curacies at Killukin, Mostrim, Ardagh and Killoe. He was the Incumbent of Clonbroney from 1872 to 1889; Archdeacon of Ardagh from 1891 to 1896; and Dean of Ardagh from 1896 until his death in 1912.

References

1912 deaths
Alumni of Trinity College Dublin
19th-century Irish Anglican priests
20th-century Irish Anglican priests
Archdeacons of Ardagh
Deans of Ardagh